The 2016–17 Ranji Trophy is the 83rd season of the Ranji Trophy, the first-class cricket tournament in India. It is being contested by 28 teams divided into three groups. Groups A and B comprise nine teams and Group C comprises ten teams. Hyderabad and Haryana qualified for the knockout stage of the tournament.

Points table

Fixtures

Round 1

Round 2

Round 3

Round 4

Round 5

Round 6

Round 7

Round 8

Round 9

See also
 2016–17 Ranji Trophy
 2016–17 Ranji Trophy Group A
 2016–17 Ranji Trophy Group B

References

External links
 Series home at ESPN Cricinfo

Ranji Trophy seasons
Ranji Trophy Trophy
Ranji Trophy
Ranji Trophy